Blueprint 3D is a puzzle video game for iOS developed by German studio FDG Entertainment and published in November 2011. The object of the game is to rotate a seemingly random jumble of dots and lines in three dimensions until they resolve into a blueprint, a line drawing of an object. The player's score for each of the 240 levels is calculated based on the time needed to solve the puzzle.

Reception
Critics reviewed Blueprint 3D favorably. Review aggregator Metacritic calculated an average score of 90% from six reviews , which the site rates as "universal acclaim". The game's originality was particularly praised.

References

Android (operating system) games
IOS games
Puzzle video games
2011 video games
Video games developed in Germany